Drumpellier Drive is a north-south road linking Ellenbrook with Reid Highway in the north-eastern suburbs of Perth. The southern section was opened as Lord Street, and was the main link between Ellenbrook and the rest of Perth until the extension of Tonkin Highway north to Gnangara Road. The road corridor has had several proposals put forward for it, including a highway, a bus rapid transit road and a railway. In 2019, a new alignment for Lord Street south of Gnangara Road opened, and it was renamed to Drumpellier Drive, making the naming consistent with the section of road north of Gnangara Road.

Route description
Drumpellier Drive is a four lane dual carriageway south of Gnangara Road, and a two lane single carriageway north of Gnangara Road.

Drumpellier Drive starts off at an intersection with Reid Highway, as a continuation of Daviot Road. From there, the road heads north, between the developing suburbs of Bennett Springs and Dayton. The road then passes to the east of Whiteman Park, and to the west of Caversham Airfield, Brabham and Henley Brook. Drumpellier Drive then passes Gnangara Road, where it heads past Ellenbrook, before terminating at a roundabout with The Promenade. Heading west on The Promenade leads to Tonkin Highway, and heading east on The Promenade leads to the Ellenbrook town centre.

Name
Drumpellier Drive is named after Drumpellier Country Park in Scotland, which was the birthplace of James Stirling.

History
The first section of what is now Drumpellier Drive was an unsealed road along the perimeter of Caversham Airfield, which was constructed during World War II. The first upgrade occurred when the road was sealed and extended down to Marshall Road during the late 1980s. At the same time, another section of the road was constructed between Gnangara Road and Park Street as part of the development of Henley Brook.

In the late 1990s, the two sections of the road were connected up, the road was extended south to Reid Highway and the northern end was converted to a roundabout and extended north as Pinaster Parade. This road would be called Lord Street. It was at this time that the satellite city of Ellenbrook was first being developed, and Lord Street served as one of the main connections between Ellenbrook and the rest of Perth.

In 2005, a new road was constructed from just west of the Lord Street/Gnangara Road roundabout to The Promenade. This road was named Drumpellier Drive and ran along the edge of Ellenbrook before heading towards the Ellenbrook town centre. This section of road was not contiguous with Lord Street.

Between 2009 and 2013, there were 172 crashes at the intersection of Lord Street and Reid Highway. At the time, the intersection had no traffic lights and Reid Highway was two lanes. In June 2014, an $8 million intersection upgrade opened. The upgrade featured traffic lights and widenings for both roads near the intersection.

In 2016, Daviot Road was constructed, linking the southern terminus of Lord Street with Caversham.

Perth-Darwin National Highway
From the 1990s, there has been a road reserve designated for the proposed Perth-Darwin National Highway which runs through and alongside Lord Street and Drumpellier Drive. The Swan Valley Bypass was proposed to be built in that road reserve, partially superseding Lord Street and Drumpellier Drive. In 2014, it was decided that the Swan Valley Bypass would be built along a different alignment, west of Whiteman Park. Construction started on the project, called NorthLink WA in June 2017. In March 2019, NorthLink WA opened as Tonkin Highway between Reid Highway and Gnangara Road, reducing traffic along Lord Street. In August 2019, the section of Tonkin Highway between Gnangara Road and The Promenade opened, which caused the intersection of Drumpellier Drive and The Promenade to be modified to a roundabout intersection.

Bus route and New Lord Street
In May 2016, the state Liberal government announced plans for a dedicated bus corridor to be built alongside Lord Street, and a realignment of Lord Street between Gnangara Road and Park Street, and Youle-Dean Road and Marshall Road, which would make Lord Street contiguous with Drumpelliar Drive. The realignment was called New Lord Street. The new bus road and Lord Street realignment was planned to travel along the corridor set aside for the Perth-Darwin National Highway. The bus corridor was planned to be a two lane grade separated road between Marshall Road and the Ellenbrook town centre, with new bus stations constructed along the route. Approximately 2,000 bus passengers travel along Lord Street every weekday. In November 2016, a $55 million contract was signed for the construction of the bus link.

In April 2017, the newly elected Labor government scrapped the plans for the dedicated bus road, instead going ahead with the plans for realigning Lord Street, but also upgrading it to a dual carriageway for its entire length. The contract was modified at no extra cost. In October 2018, construction commenced on the upgrade.

The southern section of New Lord Street between Marshall Road and Park Street opened on 4 April 2019. The northern section of New Lord Street between Park Street and Gnangara Road opened on 12 April 2019. New Lord Street was renamed to Drumpellier Drive, making the name consistent with the northern section of the road. The old sections of Lord Street were renamed to Isoodon Street and Starflower Road, and they became local roads.

Future
The Morley–Ellenbrook railway line is planned to be built partially alongside Drumpellier Drive, with Whiteman Park station built next to Drumpellier Drive and a tunnel under the intersection of Drumpellier Drive and Gnangara Road. The existing roundabout intersection with Youle-Dean Road will be replaced with a traffic light controlled intersection.

The ultimate plan for the intersection of Reid Highway, Drumpellier Drive and Daviot Road is for a grade separated interchange to be built. There is land set aside for this in the Metropolitan Region Scheme. The expected start of construction is early 2023 and the expected completion is mid-2025.

Junction list

See also
List of major roads in Perth, Western Australia

References

External links
 Drumpellier Drive Flyover from Main Roads Western Australia on YouTube.

Roads in Perth, Western Australia